Golubinsky 2-y is a rural locality (a khutor) in Golubinskoye Rural Settlement, Kalachyovsky District, Volgograd Oblast, Russia. The population was 24 as of 2010. There are 3 streets.

Geography 
Golubinsky 2-y is located in steppe, on Yergeny, 63 km north of Kalach-na-Donu (the district's administrative centre) by road. Malogolubinsky is the nearest rural locality.

References 

Rural localities in Kalachyovsky District